Sin Wi (신위, 1769 – 1847?), styled Jaha 자하 or Gyeongsudang 경수당, was a scholar official of the late Joseon period as well as an amateur-painter in the literati artistic style.

Life and legacy
Born in Pyeongsan, he was attached to the embassy sent to China in 1813. He met Feng Fangkang (1733-1818), an authority in inscriptions on stone and bronze. Following the death of Crown Prince Hyomyeong in 1830, he was sent to exile, but later recalled. He was a progressive thinker, involved  in the Sirhak movement.

His painting shows the influence of his teacher Gang Se-hwang (1713-1791), and he was also a follower of Yun Sun (1680-1741).

He is reckoned to be one of the greatest painters of bamboo, and his simple but effective landscape style showed his individuality. The same was true of his calligraphy.

Birth and death

The year of death of Sin Wi is unclear. Part of the references say 1845 while another part say 1847 ... None of these sources ever mention this discrepancy. Britannica uses the more precise statement: 1769(영조 45) 서울~1845(헌종 11).

Gallery

Sin Wi left works in various fields such as paintings, calligraphy and poetry. 

The Korean Copyright Commission lists 18 paintings, 48 calligraphies, 7 moldings and 17 documents for Sin Wi, while Towooart gives a short notice.

References

Bibliography

See also
Korean painting
List of Korean painters
Korean art

18th-century Korean painters
19th-century Korean painters
1769 births
1847 deaths
18th-century Korean poets
19th-century Korean poets